Henry Selby Clark (September 9, 1809 – January 8, 1869) was a Congressional Representative from North Carolina; born near Leechville, North Carolina, September 9, 1809; attended the common schools, and was graduated from the University of North Carolina at Chapel Hill in 1828; studied law; was admitted to the bar and commenced practice in Washington, North Carolina; member of the State house of commons 1834–1836; solicitor for the district in 1842; elected as a Democrat to the Twenty-ninth Congress (March 4, 1845 – March 3, 1847); moved to Greenville, North Carolina, and resumed the practice of law; died in Greenville, N.C., January 8, 1869; interment at his country home near Leechville.

See also 
 Twenty-ninth United States Congress

External links 
 U.S. Congressional Biographical Directory

Democratic Party members of the North Carolina House of Representatives
1809 births
1869 deaths
Democratic Party members of the United States House of Representatives from North Carolina
19th-century American politicians
People from Washington, North Carolina
People from Greenville, North Carolina
People from Beaufort County, North Carolina